PT Mercedes-Benz Distribution Indonesia is the official agent of Mercedes-Benz cars in Indonesia which has become the number one selling premium brand in Indonesia.

It has its own factory for complete knocked-down vehicles in Wanaherang, Bogor, Indonesia.

History
The history of Mercedes-Benz in Indonesia began back in 1894, when The Susuhunan of Surakarta bought a Benz-model Phaeton (2000cc, 1 cylinder, 5 hp, for eight people). This was also the first car in Indonesia.

In 1970, Mercedes-Benz collaborated with Volkswagen to set up a manufacturing line in Tanjung Priok, Jakarta, for the Indonesian market. The manufacturer then named as PT German Motor Manufacturing, with another company named PT Star Motor established as the sole agent for Mercedes-Benz vehicles in Indonesia. The factory in Tanjung Priok then began producing Mercedes-Benz commercial vehicles, which included the legendary Mercedes-Benz 911 trucks.

In 1973, the assembly line in Tanjung Priok started producing Mercedes-Benz passenger vehicles.

In 1978, the Wanaherang plant established, together with the opening of Apprentice Training Center and After Sales Service in Ciputat. This was followed by the break-up of the cooperation with Volkswagen in 1979.

In 1981, the truck production commenced. One year later, in 1982, the Wanaherang plant officially opened. In 1985, PT Star Engines Indonesia was established in Wanaherang. PT German Motor Manufacturing became the first ISO 9001-accredited automotive maker in Indonesia in 1996. It then acquired the PT Star Engines Indonesia in 2000.

Following the changing name of its parent's name from Daimler-Benz AG into DaimlerChrysler AG, PT German Motor Manufacturing then changed its name into PT DaimlerChrysler Indonesia in 2000, followed by PT Star Motors Indonesia changed into PT DaimlerChrysler Distribution Indonesia in the same year.

After Daimler AG broke up with Chrysler, PT DaimlerChrysler Indonesia changed its name into PT Mercedes-Benz Indonesia. The same happened to PT DaimlerChrysler Distribution Indonesia, which became PT Mercedes-Benz Distribution Indonesia.

Models

Locally Assembled
Mercedes-Benz A-Class sedan (A200, A35)
Mercedes-Benz C-Class sedan (C200, C300)
Mercedes-Benz E-Class sedan (E200, E300)
Mercedes-Benz S-Class sedan (S450)
Mercedes-Benz GLA (GLA200, GLA35) 
Mercedes-Benz GLC (GLC200)
Mercedes-Benz GLE (GLE450)
Mercedes-Benz GLS (GLS450)
Mercedes-Benz Axor
Mercedes-Benz buses

Imported
Mercedes-Benz B-Class (B200) 
Mercedes-Benz C-Class estate and sportier models
Mercedes-Benz CLA-Class (CLA200, CLA45S)
Mercedes-Benz CLS-Class (CLS350) 
Mercedes-Benz E-Class coupé and sportier models 
Mercedes-Benz EQE 
Mercedes-Benz EQS 
Mercedes-Benz G-Class (G350) 
Mercedes-Benz S-Class coupé and sportier models
Mercedes-Benz V-Class (V260)
Mercedes-Benz GLA sportier models 
Mercedes-Benz GLB (GLB200) 
Mercedes-Benz GLC coupé and sportier models
Mercedes-Benz GLE coupé and sportier models 
Mercedes-Benz GLS sportier models
Mercedes-Benz Sprinter 
Mercedes-Benz Vito 
Mercedes-Benz Actros
Mercedes-Benz Unimog

Gallery

See also
Automotive industry in Indonesia

References

External links
 

Mercedes-Benz
Indonesian companies established in 1970
Retail companies established in 1970